Casildo Maldaner (April 2, 1942 – May 17, 2021) was a Brazilian politician and lawyer. He represented Santa Catarina in the Federal Senate from 2011 to 2015. He was governor of Santa Catarina from 1990 to 1991. He was a member of the Brazilian Social Democracy Party.

References

2021 deaths
1942 births
People from Rio Grande do Sul
Brazilian Democratic Movement politicians
Governors of Santa Catarina (state)
Members of the Federal Senate (Brazil)
20th-century Brazilian lawyers